Po Po (born 1957) is a Burmese installation and performance artist. His work has been exhibited in Japan, South Korea and Berlin.

Life
Po Po was born in 1957 in Pathein, Myanmar. His formal name is Hla Oo. He is self-taught. A May 2004 report described Po Po as one of the younger Myanmar artists who were creating impressive works in isolation and in conditions of penury. However, Po Po is one of the few "contemporary" Myanmar artists who have been able to travel for participating in the 's event in 1999, for instance. He was also able to take part in Saigon Open City in Vietnam. In June 2010 he visited Singapore to give a talk at the Osage Art Foundation.

Work
Po Po, and another self-taught artist Aung Myint, are pioneers in the performance art field in Myanmar, with Po Po staging a 30-minute seminal performance in 1997. Po Po is widely regarded as Myanmar's first practitioner of this art form. Many of his works are playful, impulsive, ironic and sociable. Other works are provocative and shocking. His installation work "rice terrace" at the Osage Gallery in Singapore in May/June 2010 involved 1000 Styrofoam boxes, each with about 100 grains of growing rice, with the boxes arranged on mud terraces in the gallery. He describes his computer-installation Scream of the Dead, which features an open mass grave, as a metaphor for life in Myanmar and the world today. His work is thoughtful and full of depth. In his photography he employs elements of cubism, which he considers to be the "highest state of intellectual approach" to painting. A critic has said: "At best, his works reflect the lightness of being, joyfully, bearably so".

References

External links
 

Burmese performance artists
Living people
1957 births
Installation artists
People from Ayeyarwady Region